Patrice Carteron (born 30 July 1970) is a French former professional football player who played as a defender. He was most recently the manager of Saudi club Al-Ettifaq. Some of his previous managerial posts include the Mali national team, TP Mazembe, Al Ahly, Raja CA, Zamalek and Al-Taawon.

Coaching career

Cannes
In 2007, Carteron took over as manager for AS Cannes, but was replaced by Albert Emon in June 2009.

Dijon
On 25 June 2009, Dijon FCO hired the former Cannes coach. During his time with Dijon, he got the club promoted to the French top flight. On 24 May 2012, he parted company with Dijon, who had been relegated from the top division Ligue 1.

Mali national team
on 12 July 2012, he was named as the head coach of Mali, where he led the African nation to a FIFA rank as high as 21. Mali also finished third in the African Cup of Nations during his tenure.

Mazembe
On 22 May 2013, he agreed to take charge of Congolese champions TP Mazembe, signing a two-year contract. Mazembe confirmed that Carteron would become their new head coach, while continuing his duties with Mali. With Mazembe, Carteron led the club to two league titles and one African Champions League title.

On 7 January 2016, Carteron left TP Mazembe as his contract had run out.

Wadi Degla
After leaving Mazembe, Carteron took over at Wadi Degla SC in the 2016–17 season. The team won 20 of their 30 matches during Carteron's tenure.

Al-Nassr
In 2017, Carteron moved on to Al-Nassr, where he led the club to a third-place finish in the Saudi Professional League, thus qualifying for the Asian Champions League.

Phoenix Rising
On 22 May 2017, United Soccer League club Phoenix Rising announced Carteron would take over head coaching duties, and would join the club as early as the first week of June.

Al Ahly
On 12 June 2018, the nab team Al Ahly officially announced the signing of Carteron to take the seat of the manager for two years.

Following Al Ahly's loss at the 2018 CAF Champions League Final and the team's knockout from the Arab Club Champions Cup, he was sacked on 23 November 2018.

Raja CA
Carteron was appointed coach of three times CAF Confederation Cup winner Raja CA on 30 January 2019. Two months later, he won the African Super Cup against Espérence de Tunis, the second in Raja's history.

Zamalek
On 3 December 2019, Carteron was revealed as the new manager of Egyptian Premier League side Zamalek, succeeding Milutin Sredojević.
	
He won the CAF Super Cup 2020 against Espérence de Tunis, the fourth in Zamalek's history. After six days he won the 2019–20 Egyptian Super Cup against Al Ahly, the fourth in Zamalek's history, winning two one-match trophies in a one-week span. On 13 June 2020, he renewed his contract with Zamalek for one more season until 2020–21.

On 15 September 2020, Carteron announced his departure from the club putting an end to this spell in his managerial career.

Al-Taawoun
On 16 September 2020, Saudi club Al-Taawoun announced the signing of Carteron. On 18 September, he managed his first match with Al-Taawoun in a 1–0 defeat against Persepolis, followed by another heavy defeat 6–0 against Sharjah in the 2020 AFC Champions League. Later on, he won his first match with Al-Taawoun against Al-Duhail 1–0 to reach the round of 16 of the Champions League.

Return to Zamalek 
On 12 March 2021, Zamalek appointed Carteron as manager for the second time. On 24 August 2021, he led Zamalek to secure their 13th league title after a 2–0 win over El Entag El Harby.

Al-Ettifaq 
On 4 March 2022, Al-Ettifaq announced the signing of Carteron to lead the first football team until the end of the 2021–22 season. A few days earlier, Mortada Mansour, president of Zamalek club, had announced the termination of the contract with Carteron by mutual consent.

On 26 February 2023, Carteron and Al-Ettifaq agreed to end their contract mutually.

Managerial statistics

Honours

Player
Lyon
UEFA Intertoto Cup: 1997

Saint-Étienne
Ligue 2: 2003–04

Manager
TP Mazembe
Linafoot: 2013, 2013–14
CAF Champions League: 2015

Raja CA
CAF Super Cup: 2019

Zamalek
Egyptian Premier League: 2020–21
Egyptian Super Cup: 2019
CAF Super Cup: 2020

Notes

References

External links

1970 births
Living people
Sportspeople from Saint-Brieuc
Footballers from Brittany
French footballers
Association football defenders
Association football midfielders
Stade Briochin players
Stade Lavallois players
Stade Rennais F.C. players
Olympique Lyonnais players
AS Saint-Étienne players
Sunderland A.F.C. players
AS Cannes players
Ligue 1 players
Ligue 2 players
Premier League players
French expatriate footballers
French expatriate sportspeople in England
Expatriate footballers in England
French football managers
AS Cannes managers
Dijon FCO managers
Mali national football team managers
TP Mazembe managers
Wadi Degla SC managers
Al Nassr FC managers
Phoenix Rising FC coaches
Al Ahly SC managers
Raja CA managers
Zamalek SC managers
Al-Taawoun FC managers
Ettifaq FC managers
Ligue 2 managers
Ligue 1 managers
USL Championship coaches
Saudi Professional League managers
Egyptian Premier League managers
Botola managers
2013 Africa Cup of Nations managers
French expatriate football managers
French expatriate sportspeople in Mali
French expatriate sportspeople in the Democratic Republic of the Congo
French expatriate sportspeople in Egypt
French expatriate sportspeople in Saudi Arabia
French expatriate sportspeople in the United States
French expatriate sportspeople in Morocco
Expatriate football managers in Mali
Expatriate football managers in the Democratic Republic of the Congo
Expatriate football managers in Egypt
Expatriate football managers in Saudi Arabia
Expatriate soccer managers in the United States
Expatriate football managers in Morocco